Geo Sar Utha Kay is a 2017 Pakistani action-drama film which is directed and produced by Nadeem Cheema under his production banner of Cheema Films.

The film is written by Nasir Mehmood. Veteran actors such as Babar Ali, Shafqat Cheema, Nayyer Ejaz and Rashid Mehmood were cast in prominent roles. The Film is based around actual events which involved Chottu Gang of Rajanpur, 'Kacha' area of Southern Punjab, Pakistan.

Plot
The Film is based around actual events which involved Chottu Gang of Rajanpur District, 'Kacha' area of Southern Punjab, Pakistan. Where the gang brought terror on the land and the people living there, a group of police force have been sent there to put a stop to the 'Chotu Gang' although this would not be an easy operation for the police, it is anticipated to be a bloody struggle.

Cast
 Babar Ali as Rohail
 Shafqat Cheema as 'Kallu'
 Nayyar Ejaz as 'Chaudhary' 
 Sheharyar Cheema as Sherry	
 Maahi Shahi as Preeto
 Umar Cheema as Sameer
 Naeem Khan as AD
 Areeba Khan as Fiza	
 Ahmad Cheema as Husnain		
 Rashid Mehmood as Rulya
 Arshad Cheema as Chota Chaudary
 Mahnoor as Daku Rani

Music
Music by Sanval Khan

Production
The entire film was shot in Pakistan in Lahore, Murree, Bahawalpur, Rajanpur and Rahim Yar Khan. The film's Post Production was done in the United States.

Release
The trailer for the film was released on 30 June 2016. The film was released in cinemas across Pakistan on 11 August 2017.

See also
 List of Pakistani films of 2017
Nadeem Cheema

References

External links

2017 films
2017 action drama films
Pakistani action drama films
Films set in Lahore
2010s Urdu-language films
Military of Pakistan in films
2017 directorial debut films
Pakistani police films